The Promotiedivisie (English: Promotion Division) is the second tier of basketball in the Netherlands and is the highest amateur competition in the country. At the end of a Promotiedivisie-season, a Final Four is played to decide the new champion. 

The champion technically earns the right to promote to the Dutch Basketball League, although it only happens in exceptional cases, because a club has to turn professional to play in the league.

In 2012, Apollo Amsterdam became the first Promotiedivise champion to promote to the next season of the Dutch Basketball League. Lokomotief is the most successful team with three won titles.

Current teams
There were 12 teams in the 2022–23 season.

Finals

Performance by club  
Teams shown in italics are no longer in existence.

Awards
Most Valuable Player
2010  Zeeger van Leeuwen (MSV Noordwijk)
2013  Richard Maxwell (Rotterdam Basketbal 2) 
2014  Vaidas Tamasauskas (Rotterdam Basketbal 2) 
Coach of the Year
2010  Joost van Rangelrooy

References

2
Neth